Children's Bibles, or Bibles for children, are often collections of Bible stories rather than actual translations of the Bible aimed at children.

First printed in London in 1759, The Children's Bible (Philadelphia, 1763) was the earliest Bible for children printed in America. Story-Bibles include Christian Gottlob Barth's Bible Stories which was a popular children's Bible in India during the 1840s, Logan Marshall's The Wonder Book of Bible Stories (1904), Arthur S. Maxwell's  The Bible Story (1953–57) and The Children's Bible Story Book (1991) a children's version of the Bible by Anne de Graaf placed in United Kingdom primary schools by the charity Bibles for Children (founded 1997). Catherine F. Vos, wife of theologian Geerhardus Vos, was the author of the well known Child's Story Bible (1935).

Listen! is a collection of scripture readings for children for use in liturgical celebrations and school assemblies, retold from the Bible by A. J. McCallen with illustrations by Ferelith Eccles Williams, and published by Collins Liturgical Publications in 1976.

Actual Bible versions include the New Century Version, a simplified English revision of the International Children's Bible.

See also
 Bibles for Children, a UK Charity
 Children's Bible Hour, CBH Ministries

References